Negativism may refer to:

 Pessimism
 A trait of catatonic stupor
Antipositivism

See also 
 Negative (disambiguation)
 Negativity (disambiguation)